Forgotten Kingdom is folk singer-songwriter Jim Causley's fifth studio album excluding his work with The Devil's Interval and Mawkin:Causley.

Forgotten Kingdom is Causley's first album of entirely self-written material although does include references to traditional song throughout. It was intended to celebrate ten years since the release of Causley's debut album Fruits of the Earth in 2005 but the release was delayed due to poor health on the part of original producer Phil Beer. Production of the album was then completed by Show of Hands regular producer Mark Tucker at The Green Room studios in East Devon.

Forgotten Kingdom is Causley's most ambitious solo recording project to date and has the largest line-up of guest musicians of any of his albums. This guests include many well known names from the British folk scene who happen to be based in Devon such as Seth Lakeman and Show of Hands as well as some local stalwarts of the more traditional folk music scene in the county. The theme of the album centres on the history of Devon and its neighbouring counties but also looks at Causley's own personal connection to the county and his experience of growing-up within it.  The "forgotten kingdom" alluded to in the title is the Celtic Brythonic kingdom of Dumnonia which Causley previously referenced in his 2011 album; Dumnonia which was a collection of traditional songs from Devon. Not all of the songs on Forgotten Kingdom have a traditional folk feel to them and several hint at Causley's songwriting having more modern and expansive influences.

The album received highly positive reviews from The Guardian, BBC Music Magazine and fRoots among others, as well as airplay on radio shows such the Mark Radcliffe Folk Show on BBC Radio 2 and the Tom Robinson show on BBC Radio 6 Music. Writing in fRoots, Colin Irwin confirmed his previously stated opinion that Causley is "the finest singer of his generation".

Track listing
All songs by Jim Causley.

 "Gabbro Bowl / The Peninsula Prayer" – 4:53
 "Back in the Day" – 4:20
 "Banks of the Tale" – 4.04
 "The Road to Combebow" – 3:24
 "Rewind" – 4:23
 "Home" – 4:07
 "This Weekend" – 4:31
 "Pride of the Moor" – 3:48
 "Summer's End" – 5:28
 "The Man You Know" – 2:53
 "Reigning Men" – 5:18
 "Goodnight Ballad" – 6:33
 "Illogan Highway" – 7:01
 "The Pastoria" – 5:49
 "Sea Sick" – 2:48

Personnel 
 Jim Causley – accordion, piano, vocals
 James Dumbelton – acoustic guitar, vocals
 Becki Driscoll – fiddle, viola, vocals
 Nick Wyke – fiddle, octave-violin, vocals
 Phil Beer – fiddle, guitar, laud, vocals
 Steve Knightley – mandola, vocals
 Phillip Henry – dobro, chaturangi 
 Hannah Martin – fiddle
 Miranda Sykes – double bass
 Rex Preston – mandolin
 Kathryn Roberts – piano, organ, vocals
 Seth Lakeman – bouzouki
 Katy Marchant – shawm, flageolet, English bagpipes
 Steve Tyler – hurdy-gurdy 
 Matt Norman – mandolin, fiddle, banjo, bass banjo
 Mark Bazeley – melodeon
 Reese Wesson – cajun melodeon
 Lukas Drinkwater, guitar, double bass, vocals
 Jackie Oates – fiddle
 Chris Hoban – vocals
Ninebarrow
 Jon Whitley – vocals
 Jay LaBouchardiere – vocals 
The Claque
 David Lowry – vocals
 Bill Crawford – vocals
 Tom Addison – vocals
 Barry Lister – vocals

Production 
 Executive Producer – Jim Causley
 Producer – Mark Tucker
 Recording Engineers – Mark Tucker, Phil Beer and Sean Lakeman
 Audio Mixing – Mark Tucker
 Audio Mastering – Mark Tucker
 Recording locations – Lions Rest Industrial Estate, Exminster, Devon; The Green Room Studios, Upottery, Devon and Crediton Congregational Church (The Pastoria) 
 Photography – David Angel
 Packaging & Inlay design – Brad Waters
 Costume – Hilary Gillespie 
 Photography locations – Dumnonii Chronicles Village and Exeter Cathedral

References

Jim Causley albums
2016 albums